The Melrose Road Bridge is a historic bridge at the western end of Melrose Road in East Windsor, Connecticut.  Built in 1888, it is  one of a small number of surviving 19th-century lenticular pony truss bridge in the state.  It was listed on the National Register of Historic Places in 1999.  It has been closed for many years, and lacks stringers and decking.

Description and history
The Melrose Road Bridge is located in a rural area of northeastern East Windsor, at the western end of Melrose Road, where it would otherwise cross the Scantic River. This portion of the river is now part of Scantic River State Park. The bridge now consists of a wrought iron lenticular truss structure, spanning the river and mounted on brownstone abutments. The truss elements are joined by pins. Guardrails have been welded across each of the truss's ends to impede access to the structure, which lacks any sort of decking.

The truss was built in 1888 by the Berlin Iron Bridge Company, one of New England's leading manufacturers of iron bridge trusses of the late 19th century.  The truss was purchased by the town for $750, and was assembled and mounted by George Phelps, a local contractor, for $1484.  Other contractors were paid $484.  At the time of its listing on the National Register in 1999, it was one of only 15 lenticular trusses remaining in the state.

See also
National Register of Historic Places listings in Hartford County, Connecticut
List of bridges on the National Register of Historic Places in Connecticut

References

Bridges on the National Register of Historic Places in Connecticut
National Register of Historic Places in Hartford County, Connecticut
Bridges completed in 1888
Bridges in Hartford County, Connecticut
East Windsor, Connecticut
1888 establishments in Connecticut